"Lean on You" is a song by British singer Cliff Richard, released as the third single from his 1989 album Stronger. It was written and produced by Alan Tarney. The song peaked at No. 17 on the UK Singles Chart.

Track listing

UK single

7-inch vinyl (including limited edition picture disc)
"Lean on You" (4:50)
"Hey Mister" (3:54)

12-inch vinyl
"Lean on You" (Extended Mix) (8:15)
"Lean on You" (4:50)
"Hey Mister" (3:54)

CD Single
"Lean on You" (Extended Mix) (8:15)
"Lean on You" (5:02)
"Hey Mister" (3:54)

Personnel
As per the booklet for the Stronger CD:
Cliff Richard - lead and backing vocals
Alan Tarney - writer, producer, arranger, backing vocals
Gerry Kitchingham - engineer
Ben Robbins - assistant engineer

Chart performance

References

1989 songs
1989 singles
Cliff Richard songs
Songs written by Alan Tarney
Song recordings produced by Alan Tarney
EMI Records singles